The Sapucaí River is a river of São Paulo state in southeastern Brazil. It is a tributary of the Rio Grande.

Course

The river forms to the north of Santo Antônio da Alegria, just north of the BR-265 highway near the border with Minas Gerais, where the Ribeirão do Pinheirinho meets the Ribeirão Tomba-perna. It then flows in a generally northwest direction. The river is dammed twice near São Joaquim da Barra. It continues northwest and enters the Rio Grande upstream from Colômbia, São Paulo.

See also
List of rivers of São Paulo

References

Rivers of São Paulo (state)